Lawrence Michael Spriggs (born September 8, 1959) is an American former professional basketball player.

Spriggs was born in Cheverly, Maryland. A 6'7" forward from Howard University, Spriggs began his professional career in the minor-league Continental Basketball Association, where he earned 1982 Rookie of the Year Honors with the Rochester Zeniths. Spriggs later played in the National Basketball Association, most notably with the Los Angeles Lakers, with whom he won an NBA Championship in 1985. Then he played with Real Madrid Baloncesto in Spain.

References

1959 births
Living people
African-American basketball players
Albany Patroons players
American expatriate basketball people in Argentina
American expatriate basketball people in France
American expatriate basketball people in Italy
American expatriate basketball people in Spain
American expatriate basketball people in Turkey
American men's basketball players
Basketball players from Maryland
BCM Gravelines players
Chicago Bulls players
Fabriano Basket players
Houston Rockets draft picks
Houston Rockets players
Howard Bison men's basketball players
Las Vegas Silvers players
Liga ACB players
Los Angeles Lakers players
Montpellier Paillade Basket players
Olimpia de Venado Tuerto basketball players
Oyak Renault basketball players
People from Cheverly, Maryland
Real Madrid Baloncesto players
Rochester Zeniths players
San Jacinto Central Ravens men's basketball players
Santa Barbara Islanders players
Sportspeople from the Washington metropolitan area
Tofaş S.K. players
Small forwards
21st-century African-American people
20th-century African-American sportspeople